Lifted is the second solo album by Canadian country music artist Dallas Smith. It was released in Canada on November 25, 2014 via 604 Records. The album was available for pre-order on iTunes after the release of the single "Wastin' Gas," which was released on October 28, 2014. In the United States, Lifted was instead released via Big Loud Mountain Records as a six-song EP containing only the material not released on previous EP, Tippin' Point, except for a live recording of the title track.

Background
In the fall of 2013, Smith signed to American label Republic Nashville and opened for country music duo Florida Georgia Line (also on Republic Nashville) on their "Here's to the Good Times" Tour. The country duo helped write the album's lead single "Tippin' Point," which would later be certified gold by Music Canada.

Several songs from the album are featured on Smith's extended play Tippin' Point, Smith's first solo country work released in the US. The extended play sold 2,000 copies in its first week of release in the US.

Singles
The album's first single "Tippin' Point" was released on October 8, 2013, which would later sell 100,000 digital copies in Canada. The album's second and third singles — "Slow Rollin'" and "A Girl Like You" — were later released in mid-2014 to moderate success on the Canadian Hot 100.

The fourth single — "Wastin' Gas" — was released on October 28, 2014. It debuted at number 41 on the Canadian Hot 100, and sold 6,300 copies in its first week of release in the US. The single has received positive reviews, with Markos Papadatos of Digital Journal giving the song a 4.5 out of 5. It became Smith's first Canada Country leader in January 2015. "Lifted" and "Cheap Seats" were also released as singles in February and June 2015, respectively.

Other songs
"Cheap Seats" was released as the iTunes (Canada) free single of the week in promotion of the album for the week of November 25 to December 1, 2014. It was later serviced to radio as the sixth official single off the album.

Track listing

Personnel
Adapted from the CD booklet.

Kristin Barlowe - photography
Scott Cooke - bass guitar, digital editing
Scott Johnson - production assistance
Charlie Judge - keyboard
Troy Lancaster - electric guitar
Charles McHugh - drums
Joey Moi - production, mixing, recording, acoustic guitar, electric guitar, background vocals, percussion
Jamie Moore - keyboard, percussion
Eivind Nordland - recording assistance
Lloyd Aur Norman - cover art
Russ Pahl - pedal steel
Danny Rader - acoustic guitar, ganjo, bouzouki
Adam Schoenfeld - electric guitar
Jimmie Lee Sloas - bass guitar
Dallas Smith - lead vocals, background vocals
Darren Savard - electric guitar
Bryan Sutton - acoustic guitar, banjo, dobro, bouzouki, mandolin
Ilya Toshinsky - electric guitar
Derek Wells - electric guitar
Hank Williams - mastering

Chart performance

Album/EP

Singles

Certifications

References

2014 albums
Dallas Smith albums
604 Records albums
Republic Records albums
Big Loud albums
Albums produced by Joey Moi
Canadian Country Music Association Album of the Year albums
Juno Award for Country Album of the Year albums